Viper mostly refers to the snake family Viperidae. This may also refer to:

Animals
 Water viper (Agkistrodon piscivorus), a venomous snake found in eastern North America
 Eastern hognose snake (Heterodon platirhinos), a snake found in North America

Arts and entertainment

Film and television
 The Viper (1938 film), a lost British film
 The Viper (1965 film), a Soviet drama film
 Viper (film), a 2001 film
 Vipers (film), a 2008 film
 Viper (TV series), a 1990s American series
 "Viper" (Gotham), a television episode

Music
 Viper (band), a Brazilian heavy metal band
 Vyper, an American heavy metal band, which signed a contract with Eric Greif
 The Viper Label, a British indie record label
 "Viper," a song on the album Loudspeaker by Marty Friedman
 Viper (rapper), an American musician regarded as a pioneer of cloud rap

Roller coasters
 Viper (Six Flags Darien Lake), in New York
 Viper (Six Flags AstroWorld), in Texas
 Viper (Six Flags Great Adventure), in New Jersey
 Viper (Six Flags Great America), in Illinois
 Viper (Six Flags Magic Mountain), in California
 Viper (Six Flags Over Georgia), in Georgia

Fictional characters
 Viper (G.I. Joe), the code-name given to a large majority of the soldiers in the Cobra Organization toys
 Viper (Marvel Comics), the name of four fictional villains
 Viper (Madame Hydra), a villainess in Marvel Comics
 Viper (Reborn! character), a character in Reborn!
 Viper (Sgt. Frog), a family of characters in Sgt. Frog
 Viper, a character in Valorant
 Viper Squad, characters in the Manta Force toyline
 Crimson Viper, a Street Fighter character
 Dr. Viper, a SWAT Kats character
 General Viper, a character in Chrono Cross
 Master Viper, a character in the Kung Fu Panda franchise
 Black Arts Viper, a Metal Gear: Ghost Babel character
 Viper, a member of the Apex Predators in video game Titanfall 2

Other arts and entertainment
 Viper Comics, an independent publisher of comic books and graphic novel trade paperbacks
 Vipers, fighters on the Battlestar Galactica in Battlestar Galactica
 Viper, a series of adult games by publisher and developer Sogna

Consumer products
 ESP Viper, an electric guitar
 Ovation Viper, a guitar
 Remington Model 522 Viper, a semi-automatic rifle
 Serpent Viper 977, a 1/8 scale radio controlled pan-car by Serpent
 Thomson Viper FilmStream Camera
 Viper, a brand of vacuum cleaner by Nilfisk
 Viper, car alarms and accessories produced by Directed Electronics

Military uses

Aviation
 General Dynamics F-16 Fighting Falcon, a jet fighter aircraft nicknamed "Viper"
 HMLA-169, a USMC helicopter squadron nicknamed "Vipers"
 Bell AH-1Z Viper, a twin-engine attack helicopter
 Armstrong Siddeley Viper, a turbojet engine

Naval vessels
 HMS Viper, various Royal Navy ships
 KRI Viper, an Indonesian Navy patrol boat
 USS Viper, three United States Navy ships

Rockets and missiles
 AGM-80 Viper, an American air-to-surface missile
 Dornier Viper, an air-to-air missile
 FGR-17 Viper, an antitank rocket, subject of a government spending controversy
 Giant Viper, a rocket-launched mine-clearance system

Other military uses
 Operation Viper, conducted by the United States military in Afghanistan
 VIPeR, a military robot

People
 Kimberly Benson (born 1991), Scottish professional wrestler, ring name Viper
 Martin "The Viper" Foley (born 1952), Irish criminal
 Stephanie Green (1959–2010), American pornographic actress, stage name Viper
 Randy Orton (born 1980), American professional wrestler nicknamed "The Viper"
 Viper (rapper) (born 1971),  American rapper

Places
 Viper, Kentucky, an unincorporated community
 Viper Island, Andaman Islands
 The Viper, Mill Green, a public house in Essex, England

Sports teams
 Alabama Vipers, an American football team
 Calgary Vipers, a Canadian baseball team
 Newcastle Vipers, a British ice hockey club
 Rio Grande Valley Vipers, an American basketball team
 Southern Vipers, an English women's cricket team
 St. Louis Vipers, an American roller hockey team
 Vaughan Vipers, a junior ice hockey team in Ontario, Canada (operated 1991–2012)
 Vernon Vipers, a junior A hockey team in British Columbia, Canada (established in 1961)
 Vipers Kristiansand, a Norwegian handball team
 HC Vipers Tallinn, an Estonian ice hockey team

Technology
 Video Identification Parade Electronic Recording (VIPER), a British system for conducting digital identity parades
 VIPER microprocessor, a microprocessor designed by the Royal Signals and Radar Establishment
 Viper telescope, used to view mainly cosmic background radiation
 VIPER (rover), a planned NASA lunar rover
 Vyper, one of the programming languages used in Ethereum

Transportation

Air
 Paxman Viper, a Canadian ultralight aircraft design
 Tomark Viper SD4, an airplane made in Slovakia beginning in the mid-2000s
 Dynamic Sport Viper, a Polish paraglider design
 Wolseley Viper, a V-8 aircraft engine

Land
 Dodge Viper, a two-seat sports car manufactured by Chrysler (previously known as the SRT Viper)
 Eurofly Viper, an Italian ultralight trike design
 Millyard Viper V10, a one-off motorcycle
 Velocette Viper, a British motorcycle made by Velocette between 1955 and 1968

Sea
 Viper 640, an American sailboat design
 Viper (catamaran), catamaran used for racing

Other uses
 VIPERs, exchange-traded funds issued by The Vanguard Group
 Viper (hieroglyph), an Egyptian hieroglyph

See also
 VIPIR (disambiguation)
 Valley Vipers (disambiguation)

Animal common name disambiguation pages